Events from the year 1929 in Scotland.

Incumbents 

 Secretary of State for Scotland and Keeper of the Great Seal – Sir John Gilmour, Bt until 4 June; then William Adamson

Law officers 
 Lord Advocate – William Watson until May; then Alexander Munro MacRobert until June; then Craigie Mason Aitchison
 Solicitor General for Scotland – Alexander Munro MacRobert until May; then Wilfrid Normand until June; then John Watson

Judiciary 
 Lord President of the Court of Session and Lord Justice General – Lord Clyde
 Lord Justice Clerk – Lord Alness
 Chairman of the Scottish Land Court – Lord St Vigeans

Events 
 19 January – Perth Corporation Tramways cease operation, being replaced by bus services operated by W. Alexander & Sons.
 4 May
 Alexander Munro MacRobert appointed Lord Advocate, replacing William Watson.
 Wilfrid Normand appointed Solicitor General for Scotland, replacing Alexander Munro MacRobert.
 10 May – Local Government (Scotland) Act 1929 enacted. Aberdeen, Dundee, Edinburgh and Glasgow are confirmed as having city status in the United Kingdom.
 31 May – the United Kingdom general election returns a hung parliament. Labour is the party with the largest number of seats in Scotland. On 8 June Ramsay MacDonald forms a new Labour government.
 19 June
 Craigie Aitchison appointed as Lord Advocate, replacing Alexander Munro MacRobert.
 John Watson appointed as Solicitor General for Scotland, replacing Wilfrid Normand.
 2 October – the Union between the Church of Scotland and the United Free Church of Scotland takes place.
 31 December – Glen Cinema Disaster in Paisley: 69 children die trying to escape smoke.
 Legislation requires both parties to a marriage in Scotland to be at least 16 years old (although no parental consent is needed).
 Edinburgh crematorium opened at Warriston Cemetery.
 Aluminium smelter at Fort William opened in conjunction with Lochaber hydroelectric scheme.
 Lady Blanche Pit at Dysart, Fife, is closed.
 Bus operator Scottish General Transport is renamed Western Scottish Motor Traction.
 Ross County F.C. founded in Dingwall. They initially play in the Highland League.
 The Benmore Botanic Garden becomes the first regional garden of the Royal Botanic Garden Edinburgh.

Births 
 12 January – Alasdair MacIntyre, philosopher
 25 January – Charles Gray, Labour politician (died 2023)
 3 February – Ronnie Fraser, agricultural journalist and Liberal politician (died 2010)
 12 April – Elspet Gray, Lady Rix, actress (died 2013 in London)
 17 April – Eve Pearce, actress
 11 May – Stan Kane, actor and singer (died 2015 in Canada)
 25 May – Arthur Montford, Scottish Television sports journalist (died 2014) 
 11 June – George Gale, cartoonist (died 2003)
 12 June – John McCluskey, Baron McCluskey, lawyer (died 2017)
 16 June – Alex Govan, footballer (died 2016 in Plymouth)
 22 June – John Mone, Roman Catholic Bishop of Paisley (died 2016)
 10 July – Winnie Ewing, SNP MP and MEP
 15 July – Rhoda Bulter, poet (died 1994)
 24 August – John Mackintosh, pro-devolution Labour politician (died 1978)
 20 September – Joe Temperley, jazz saxophonist (died 2016)
 26 November - William Dysart, actor (died 2002 in London)
 2 December – Harry Benson, photographer
 9 December - Reay Tannahill, historian and novelist (died 2007 in London)
 11 December – Kenneth MacMillan, choreographer (died 1992 in London)

Deaths 
 1 February – Alexander Ogston, surgeon, discoverer of Staphylococcus (born 1844) 
 3 May – George Gough Arbuthnot, businessman and civic leader in British India (born 1848)
 14 August – Henry Horne, 1st Baron Horne, First World War general (born 1861) 
 30 August – William Menzies Alexander, medical and theological writer (born 1858)     
 13 September – Robert Lorimer, architect (born 1864)
 3 October – Robert Climie, trade unionist and Labour MP (born 1868)
 John Brown Abercromby artist (born 1843)

The arts 
 12 August – Edinburgh Playhouse opens as a super-cinema.

See also 
 Timeline of Scottish history
 1929 in Northern Ireland

References 

 
Years of the 20th century in Scotland
Scotland
1920s in Scotland